Livonia Baptist Church, also known as the Livonia Congregational Church and Livonia United Church of Christ, is a historic Baptist church located at Livonia in Livingston County, New York. The building is typical of the vernacular interpretation of the Greek Revival style in 19th century western New York.

It was built by a Baptist congregation in 1870. By the early 20th century, the people changed and in 1924 the church was transferred to Congregational use. In 1964 the United Church of Christ congregation was formed. After it declined, the building was used as a community center.

The building was listed in 1977 on the National Register of Historic Places.

References

Churches on the National Register of Historic Places in New York (state)
Baptist churches in New York (state)
Former churches in New York (state)
Greek Revival church buildings in New York (state)
Churches completed in 1870
19th-century Baptist churches in the United States
United Church of Christ churches in New York (state)
Congregational churches in New York (state)
Churches in Livingston County, New York
National Register of Historic Places in Livingston County, New York